Cyril Thato Lingwati (born 11 June 1992) is a South African soccer player who plays as a centre-back for South African Premier Division side Royal AM.

References

Living people
1992 births
People from Sekhukhune District Municipality
Soccer players from Limpopo
South African soccer players
South Africa international soccer players
Association football defenders
Jomo Cosmos F.C. players
Bloemfontein Celtic F.C. players
Royal AM F.C. players
South African Premier Division players